John Boone may refer to:
John D. Boon (1817–1864), American merchant and politician
John H. Boone (1848–1884), lawyer and politician in Newfoundland
John William "Blind" Boone (1864–1927), American musician and composer
John Boone, fictional character in the Mars trilogy by Kim Stanley Robinson